The Women's compound archery competition at the 2009 World Games took place from 24 to 26 July 2009 at the Chengcing Lake in Kaohsiung, Taiwan.

Competition format
A total of 16 archers entered the competition. The best four athletes from preliminary round qualifies to the semifinals.

Results

Preliminary round

Finals

References

External links
 Results on IWGA website

Field archery at the 2009 World Games